The 1986 United States Senate election in Ohio took place on November 3, 1986. It was concurrent with elections to the United States House of Representatives. Incumbent Democratic U.S Senator John Glenn won re-election to a third term.

General election

Candidates
 Kathleen M. Button (Independent)
 John Glenn, incumbent U.S. Senator (Democratic)
 William M. Harris (Independent)
 Tom Kindness, U.S. Representative from Hamilton (Republican)

Results

See also 
 1986 United States Senate elections

References 

Ohio
1986
1986 Ohio elections
John Glenn